Scott Bartlett (1943 – September 29, 1990 in San Francisco, CA)  was one of the premiere abstract/experimental cinematic artists of the late 1960s and the 1970s. His acclaimed work, such as his intense abstract 16mm movie Moon 1969, is greatly admired by many movie directors, including Francis Ford Coppola and George Lucas. His notable abstract movies and visual avant-garde motion pictures includes Serpent, Medina, Metanomen, Lovemaking, and the poignant interior documentary 1970. His 1967-1972 experiment OffOn, shot on 16mm, was groundbreaking for its use of new video imagery technologies.

Late career
His science fiction epic feature "Interface" was in pre-production for many years, having completed a pre-visualization version starring a then unknown William Hurt. The project was canceled during one of the  many difficult periods for Francis Coppola's Zoetrope Studios. He continued to work in various artistic endeavors and was regularly consulted by special effects crews for large Hollywood movies including Altered States, and George Lucas hired him to create the "montage design" for the sequel More American Graffiti.

Personal life
He graduated from the Illinois Institute of Technology. Scott Bartlett was married to filmmaker Freude Bartlett with whom he had a son, Adam. They were divorced. He died of complications from a kidney and liver transplant.

Selected filmography
Metanomen (1966)
OffOn (1968)-National Film Registry inductee
 A Trip to the Moon (1968), black and white, 33 minutes
Moon 1969 (1969), color 15 minutes
Standup And Be Counted (with Freude Bartlett) (1969) color, 3 minutes.
Medina (1972) 
Heavy Metal (1979)
The Making of OffOn (1980)
Find Your Place (1990)

References

Youngblood, Gene. Expanded Cinema. E. P. Dutton & Co., New York 1973,
Michael Goodwin and Naomi Wise, On the Edge: The Life and Times of Francis Coppola. William Morrow & Co; 1st edition (November 1989)

External links
 
Scott Bartlett on UbuWeb
OffOn (1968) at the National Film Preservation Foundation
Films of Scott Bartlett at The Film-Makers' Cooperative

American experimental filmmakers
1943 births
1990 deaths
American film directors
American video artists